Metric gauge may refer to:
 Metre gauge, a rail gauge
 A instrument gauge that reads in metric measurements
 A wire gauge size expressed in metric units